A prefix hash tree (PHT) is a distributed data structure that enables more sophisticated queries over a distributed hash table (DHT). The prefix hash tree uses the lookup interface of a DHT to construct a trie-based data structure that is both efficient (updates are doubly logarithmic in the size of the domain being indexed), and resilient (the failure of any given node in a prefix hash tree does not affect the availability of data stored at other nodes).

References

External links 
https://www.eecs.berkeley.edu/~sylvia/papers/pht.pdf - Prefix Hash Tree: An Indexing Data Structure over Distributed Hash Tables
http://pier.cs.berkeley.edu - PHT was developed as part of work on the PIER project.\

See also 
Prefix tree
P-Grid

Distributed data storage